Tayyab Madni is an Australian producer, writer, and director. He is best known for working as a financial consultant for several films including, The Man Who Knew Infinity (2016) and Hotel Mumbai (2018).

Early life and education 
Madni was born in Sydney, Australia. He was educated at St Paul's Grammar School and received his degree in Hospitality Management from the University of Western Sydney in 1997.

Career 
Madni has worked as a financial consultant and associate producer in movies such as The Man Who Knew Infinity produced by Edward R. Pressman, Hotel Mumbai produced by Basil Iwanyk, Yaman, and Aussie Who Baffled The World. In in 2017, he founded a production house company, Picture Works Australia. He is also an executive member of the International Show Biz Expo (ISBE). In 2022, he won Berlin International Art Film Festival's Best Indie Short Film along with Hafedh Dakhlaoui for Sayonee, a 2021 short film.

Awards and recognition 

 Best Indie short film – 8th Berlin Art Film Festival.
 Best Feature Film Director – 8th Berlin Art Film Festival.
 Best Music Award – LGBT Feedback Film Festival in Los Angeles

References

External links 

 

Australian film directors
Living people
Australian film producers
Australian screenwriters
Year of birth missing (living people)